The Life of the World to Come is the twelfth studio album by the Mountain Goats, released on October 6, 2009. The third track, "Genesis 3:23", was released as a free download via the band's website on July 28. The album peaked at #110 on the Billboard Top 200 albums on its chart debut.

Continuing in their exploration of religious themes, The Life of the World to Come is composed of twelve tracks, each one inspired by (and titled after) a single verse from the Jewish Tanakh and the Christian New Testament. The album's title comes from a line of the Nicene Creed.

Early copies of the album sold via Rough Trade's physical and online stores featured a bonus CD-R, The Life of the World in Flux. It contains early drafts of most of songs which appears on the main album and some that do not, and stylistically resembles both the band's pre-2002 albums and the 2005 The Sunset Tree LP.

Reception

The album was positively reviewed by critics, gaining 78/100 points on Metacritic. Pitchfork Media listed it as 45th best of the year, adding that album is "a work of deep, profound empathy-- the kind of thing the Bible is supposed to teach us in the first place".

As of October 2009 it has sold 14,000 copies in United States according to Nielsen SoundScan.

Track listing

Personnel
John Darnielle - acoustic guitar, vocals, piano, keyboards
Owen Pallett - strings, arrangement
Peter Hughes - bass, electric guitar
Jon Wurster - drums, percussion
Vaughan Oliver - art direction, design
Phoebe Richardson - artwork
Brian Whitehead - assistant design
Scott Solter - mixing
Marc Atkins - photography
Brandon Eggleston - production, engineering (Chicago)
Grégoire Yeche - assistant production, assistant engineering (Chicago)
John Congleton - production, engineering (Tornillo)
Charles Godfrey - assistant production, assistant engineering (Tornillo)
Scott Solter - production, engineering (Monroe)

References

The Mountain Goats albums
2009 albums
Albums produced by John Congleton
Concept albums
Music based on the Bible
Albums produced by Scott Solter